Imbsheim is a village and a former commune in the Bas-Rhin department, eastern France.  Since March 1, 1973, this village has been an associated commune of Bouxwiller. Its population is 536 (2019).

Names
The village was mentioned in 1178 as Ummenesheim which probably comes from Umbiniacum. formed by the Paleo-European root meaning a terrain obstacle or hollow, since the village is located near Bastberg Hill.

Heraldry
Upon the arms of the village is emblazoned "Coupé au premier d'argent au buste de Saint-Martin de carnation mitré et nimbé d'or, vêtu pontificalement d'azur et d'argent, bénissant de la dextre et tenant de la senestre un livre d'or, au deuxième d'or au lion de gueules et à la bordure du même."

Nickname in Alsatian language
Steinbicker (the stone miners), in reference to the quarrying of ancient stones in the hills of Bastberg.

References

Former communes of Bas-Rhin
Bas-Rhin communes articles needing translation from French Wikipedia
Populated places disestablished in 1973